The Diwei Bridge is a cable-stayed bridge which crosses the Yangtze River in Chongqing, China. The bridge carries 6 lanes of road traffic of China National Highway 212 on the upper deck and Line 5, Chongqing Rail Transit between the Jiangjin District south of the Yangtze River and the Jiulongpo District to the north.

See also
 List of longest cable-stayed bridge spans
 Yangtze River bridges and tunnels

References

Bridges in Chongqing
Bridges over the Yangtze River
Cable-stayed bridges in China
Bridges completed in 2013